Simon Jecl (born 14 April 1986) is a former Slovenian freestyle skier who specialized in the skicross discipline.

He made his World Cup debut in January 2008 in Les Contamines, and collected his first World Cup points in January 2009, with a 27th place in St. Johann in Tirol.

He represents the sports club SD Vagabund.

World Cup

Cup standings

Other results

FIS Freestyle World Ski Championships

References

1986 births
Living people
Slovenian male freestyle skiers